"Hey Whatever" is a song by Irish boy band Westlife. It was released on 15 September 2003 as the lead single from their fourth studio album, Turnaround (2003). The song is a re-written version of "Rainbow Zephyr", a popular song by Irish rock band Relish. Released on 15 September 2003, the song peaked at number four on the UK Singles Chart.

In Westlife - Our Story, the band said they pushed for "Hey Whatever" to be released as the lead single despite Simon Cowell telling them they did not have a hit. The song became one of Westlife's lowest-charting singles and was their first not to sell more than 100,000 copies at the time, selling just under 80,000.

Track listings
UK CD1
 "Hey Whatever"
 "I Won't Let You Down"
 "Hey Whatever" (video)

UK CD2
 "Hey Whatever"
 "Singing Forever"
 "Tonight" (Metro Mix video)
 "The Making of the Video" (video)

UK cassette single and European CD single
 "Hey Whatever" – 3:28
 "I Won't Let You Down" – 3:45

Charts

Weekly charts

Year-end charts

References

External links
 Official Westlife website

Westlife songs
2003 singles
2003 songs
Bertelsmann Music Group singles
RCA Records singles
Song recordings produced by Steve Mac
Songs written by Steve Mac
Songs written by Wayne Hector
Sony Music singles